Changchun station is a railway station of Beijing–Harbin railway, Harbin–Dalian railway, Changchun–Tumen railway, Changchun–Baicheng railway and Changchun–Jilin intercity railway. The station is located in Changchun, in the Jilin province of China. It is served by Changchun Rail Transit Line Line 1, Line 3 and Line 4.

History
The station opened in 1907. The new station building was constructed in 1994. In 2014, renovations were completed on an expanded station, with additional tracks and a new north building. A new masonry south facade was added.

Services

China Railway

Chanchun Subway

Changchun Railway Station

Changchun Railway Station is a subway station on Line 1 and Line 3 of the Changchun Subway in China. It is located in Kuancheng District in Changchun under the building of Changchun railway station southern square. The station first opened on 30 October 2002, when Line 3 was put in operation.

Changchun Railway Station is an underground station with one platform and two side tracks per line. Line 1 runs at the station in the direction north-south, and Line 3 runs west-east.

Changchun Railway Station (North)

Changchun Railway Station (North) is a subway station on Line 1 and Line 4 of the Changchun Subway in China. It is located in Kuancheng District in Changchun under the building of Changchun railway station northern square, hence the name. The station first opened on 7 May 2012, when Line 4 was put in operation.

Changchun Railway Station (North) is an underground station with one platform and two side tracks per line. Line 1 runs at the station in the direction north-south, and Line 4 runs west-east.

See also
2167/2168 Changchun-Mudanjiang Through Train
Changchun Light Rail Transit
Chinese Eastern Railway
South Manchuria Railway
South Manchuria Railway Zone

References

External links

Railway stations in China opened in 1907
Buildings and structures in Changchun
Buildings and structures in Jilin
Transport in Changchun
Transport in Jilin
Railway stations in Changchun
Railway stations in Jilin
Stations on the Changchun–Jilin Intercity Railway
Stations on the Beijing–Harbin Railway